Starosiedle  is a village in the administrative district of Gmina Gubin, within Krosno Odrzańskie County, Lubusz Voivodeship, in western Poland, close to the German border.

Notable residents
Paul Johannes Tillich (1886–1965), German-American theologian

See also
Territorial changes of Poland after World War II

References

External links
Area map

Starosiedle